The Vatican is an online mixtape by Natas, released on March 25, 2009 on acidrap.com. The Vatican is the first set of new Natas material featuring all three core members together at the same time.

Track listing

References

2009 compilation albums
Reel Life Productions compilation albums